William Lang may refer to:
 William Lang (American football), coach of the Maryland Terrapins football team, 1908–1909
 William Henry Lang (1874–1960), British botanist
 William Dickson Lang (1878–1966), keeper of the department of geology at the British Museum, 1928–1938
 William Lang (British athlete) (c. 1838–?), professional British runner
 William Lang (architect) (1846–1897), American architect

See also
 Bill Lang (William Langfranchi, 1883–1952), Australian professional boxer